Pousse-café (French, literally "coffee-pusher") may refer to:

 a digestif, an alcoholic beverage consumed after the coffee course, such as cognac in an espresso cup
 a layered drink composed of several layers of differently colored liqueurs